The inferior dental plexus is a nerve plexus which supplies the lower jaw. It is branches off of the inferior alveolar nerve and functions as innervation to the mandibular molars, first bicuspid, and part of the second bicuspid. The inferior dental plexus does not supply innervation to the cuspids or incisors as they get innervation from the incisive branch of the inferior alveolar nerve which branches as the inferior alveolar nerve exits the mental foramen as the mental nerve.

See also
 Superior dental plexus

Mandibular nerve